Daniel "Dan" Cahill is an American politician from Massachusetts member of the Massachusetts House of Representatives. He was elected in a special election on May 10, 2016. A resident of Lynn, Massachusetts, Cahill was elected as a Democrat to represent the 10th Essex district. He has sponsored 17 bills.

He is a former Lynn School Committee member. He is President of the Lynn City Council.

See also
 2019–2020 Massachusetts legislature
 2021–2022 Massachusetts legislature

References

Democratic Party members of the Massachusetts House of Representatives
Lynn, Massachusetts City Council members
Living people
School board members in Massachusetts
21st-century American politicians
Year of birth missing (living people)